Mont phet htok, also known as htapana htok in Upper Myanmar), is a traditional Burmese snack or mont.

The dish is a pyramidal rice dumpling filled with coconut meat, which is cooked in sugar or jaggery, and then steamed in banana leaves.

Similar dishes
Similar desserts in the region include Vietnamese bánh phu thê and Chinese zongzi.

References

Burmese cuisine
Dumplings
Foods containing coconut
Steamed foods
Glutinous rice dishes
Rice cakes